Thomas Böcker (born October 8, 1977) is a German producer. He is the founder of Merregnon Studios and creative director of his orchestral music projects Merregnon and Game Concerts.

In 2003, he produced the first live orchestra performance of video game music outside Japan at the Gewandhaus in Leipzig, Germany, which led to his international series Game Concerts, including the Final Symphony world tour from 2013, the first performance of video game music by the London Symphony Orchestra, and from 2021 the symphonic fairy tale Merregnon: Land of Silence, premiered by the Royal Stockholm Philharmonic Orchestra.

Thomas Böcker was presented with the national Cultural and Creative Pilots Award by the German Federal Government, which recognises outstanding entrepreneurs within Germany’s cultural and creative industries.

Early life

Thomas Böcker grew up in the small mountain town of Lauenstein in East Germany. During the 80s, his father was allowed to travel to the western part of Germany to visit his own mother and brought back a Commodore 64 for the family. For this reason, Böcker already had access to a home computer at the age of 7. Soon enough, he developed a passion for video game music and became especially fond of Chris Huelsbeck’s works on the Turrican series. Böcker's love of video game and classical music would soon come together, as he realised the potential for scores and concerts to feature orchestral game music.

Concert productions

Game Concerts in Leipzig (2003 - 2007)

On August 20, 2003 Thomas Böcker produced his first Game Concert as a part of the official opening ceremony of the Leipzig Games Convention, performed by the Czech National Symphony Orchestra at the Gewandhaus Leipzig, promoted by the Leipzig Trade Fair. Following the success of the event, further four annual concerts with various programmes took place under his direction until 2007, performed by the FILMharmonic Orchestra Prague. A large number of composers took part in the events and the associated autograph sessions, including Nobuo Uematsu, Yuzo Koshiro, Chris Huelsbeck, Rob Hubbard and Allister Brimble.

Game Concerts in Cologne (2008 - 2012) 
Symphonic Shades – Hülsbeck in Concert in honour of German composer Chris Hülsbeck was the first of five annual concerts by the WDR Funkhausorchester dedicated to music from video games. It took place twice at the Funkhaus Wallrafplatz in Cologne on 23 August 2008, for which Böcker worked as producer, as he did for the subsequent projects. Symphonic Shades was the first concert with game music to be broadcast live on the radio on WDR4. An album release of the recording was made in the same year (via synSONIQ Records).

Symphonic Fantasies – Music from Square Enix was dedicated to music by the Japanese game developer Square Enix. The performance on 12 September 2009, like the following WDR performances, took place at the Kölner Philharmonie. It was broadcast live on the radio on WDR4 and was the first concert of the genre to be streamed online as a live video. In 2012, five more concerts were performed in Tokyo, Stockholm and again in Cologne, and in 2016 additionally at the Barbican Centre in London with the London Symphony Orchestra. Albums have been released of concert recordings from both Cologne (via Decca Records) and Tokyo (via X5Music/Merregnon Records).

Symphonic Legends – Music from Nintendo took place on 23 September 2010, focusing on video game music by the Japanese game developer Nintendo. The performance LEGENDS on 1 June 2011, presented by the Royal Stockholm Philharmonic Orchestra at the Stockholm Concert Hall, was partly based on arrangements from Symphonic Legends. On 13 July 2014, the London Symphony Orchestra performed the symphonic poem to The Legend of Zelda from this programme.

Symphonic Odysseys — Tribute to Nobuo Uematsu was a tribute to the Japanese composer Nobuo Uematsu. The programme was performed twice by the WDR Funkhausorchester on 9 July 2011. There were also performances in June 2017 by the London Symphony Orchestra: on 18 June at the Philharmonie de Paris and on 20 June at the Barbican Centre. A recording of the concerts in Cologne was released as a double album by Dog Ear Records.

Game Concerts worldwide (from 2013)
Final Symphony is a concert production by Thomas Böcker that includes music from Final Fantasy VI, VII and X. The world premiere was performed by the Sinfonieorchester Wuppertal on 11 May 2013, with a further concert on 30 May 2013 with the London Symphony Orchestra. The programme subsequently toured the world with performances in Japan, Denmark, Sweden, Finland, the Netherlands, the USA, New Zealand, China, Austria and Australia. A Final Symphony studio album was released in 2015, a recording with the London Symphony Orchestra at Abbey Road Studios.

The world premiere of Final Symphony II, featuring music from Final Fantasy V, VIII, IX and XIII, took place on 29 August 2015 at the Beethovenhalle in Bonn, Germany, performed by the Beethoven Orchester Bonn, followed by four performances in September and October 2015 by the London Symphony Orchestra in London, Osaka and twice in Yokohama. In addition to events in Germany, the UK and Japan, Final Symphony II was also presented in Finland, Sweden and the Netherlands.

Symphonic Memories – Music from Square Enix, featuring video game music from Japanese game developer Square Enix, was premiered by the Royal Stockholm Philharmonic Orchestra at the Stockholm Concert Hall on 9 June 2018. Other events took place in Finland, Switzerland, Japan and Germany. The concerts in Japan were recorded and released as a double album by Square Enix's music label.

In 2021, for the tenth anniversary of Bethesda Softworks''' action role-playing game Skyrim, Böcker produced a concert film featuring the London Symphony Orchestra and London Voices at Alexandra Palace in London. The video was released on YouTube on 11 November 2021, shortly followed by a music album.

Merregnon: Land of Silence (from 2021)Merregnon: Land of Silence is a symphonic fairy tale with music composed by Yoko Shimomura. It was produced by Thomas Böcker to introduce young people and families to orchestral music in the tradition of Sergei Prokofiev's Peter and the Wolf, with modern means adopting a game and anime aesthetic. The work was premiered and filmed by the Royal Stockholm Philharmonic Orchestra at the Stockholm Concert Hall in June 2021. On 10 September of the same year, the video was published on the orchestra's website. From 2022 onwards, worldwide performances have been announced with orchestras such as the Orchestre de Chambre de Lausanne, the Staatsphilharmonie Rheinland-Pfalz and, once again, the Royal Stockholm Philharmonic Orchestra.

Recordings (selection)

 2021 Skyrim 10th Anniversary Concert (Bethesda Softworks, Producer)
 2021 Merregnon: Land of Silence (Merregnon Studios, Producer)
 2021 Albion Online (Sandbox Interactive, Project coordinator)
 2020 Symphonic Memories Concert (live concert album, Square Enix, Production consultant)
 2020 PUBG MOBILE — Theme Music, Orchestral Version (Bluehole, Project coordinator)
 2017 Turrican — Orchestral Selections (Chris Huelsbeck Productions, Co-producer)
 2016 Turrican II — The Orchestral Album (Chris Huelsbeck Productions, Co-producer)
 2015 Final Symphony — music from Final Fantasy VI, VII and X (Merregnon Studios/Square Enix/X5 Music Group, Producer)
 2012 Symphonic Fantasies Tokyo (live concert album, Merregnon Studios/Square Enix, Producer)
 2010 Symphonic Fantasies — music from Square Enix (live concert album, Decca Records/Square Enix, Producer)
 2010 Benyamin Nuss Plays Uematsu (Deutsche Grammophon, Production consultant)
 2008 Symphonic Shades — Hülsbeck in concert (live concert album, Merregnon Studios, Producer)
 2008 drammatica — Yoko Shimomura (Square Enix, Project coordinator)
 2007 Distant Worlds: music from Final Fantasy (AWR Music/Square Enix, Production consultant)
 2007 Vielen Dank — Masashi Hamauzu (Square Enix, Project coordinator)
 2007 World Club Championship Football (Sega, Project coordinator)
 2005 S.T.A.L.K.E.R.: Shadow of Chernobyl (THQ, Project coordinator)
 2004 Merregnon — Volume 2 (Merregnon Studios, Producer)

Awards (selection)

 2020 Best Album - Official Arranged Album: Symphonic Memories Concert – music from Square Enix, Annual Game Music Awards 2020
 2015 Best Album - Arranged Album: Final Symphony – music from Final Fantasy, Annual Game Music Awards 2015
 2015 Outstanding Entrepreneurship - Cultural and Creative Pilots Award, German Federal Government
 2015 First person to produce a video game concert outside Japan: Thomas Böcker, Guinness World Records
 2013 Outstanding Production - Concert: Final Symphony London – music from Final Fantasy, Annual Game Music Awards 2013
 2012 Outstanding Production - Concert: Symphonic Fantasies Tokyo – music from Square Enix, Annual Game Music Awards 2012
 2011 Outstanding Production - Concert: Symphonic Odysseys – Tribute to Nobuo Uematsu, Annual Game Music Awards 2011
 2011 Best Live Concert: Symphonic Odysseys – Tribute to Nobuo Uematsu, Annual Original Sound Version Awards 011
 2011 Best Live Concert: Symphonic Legends – music from Nintendo, Annual Original Sound Version Awards 2010
 2010 Best Arranged Album - Solo / Ensemble: Symphonic Fantasies – music from Square Enix, Annual Game Music Awards 2010
 2010 Best Concert: Symphonic Legends – music from Nintendo'', Swedish LEVEL magazine

References

External links
Thomas Böcker's official website, 
Game Concerts website, 

Living people
1977 births
People from Dohna
German producers
Businesspeople from Dresden